William Burchett (1694 - 27 December 1750) was a Canon of Windsor from 1739 to 1750.

Career

He was educated at Eton College and Peterhouse, Cambridge and graduated BA in 1716, and MA in 1719.

He was appointed to the second stall in St George's Chapel, Windsor Castle in 1739, and held the stall until 1750.

Notes 

1694 births
1750 deaths
Canons of Windsor
People educated at Eton College
Alumni of Peterhouse, Cambridge